Bushley is a small village and civil parish in the Malvern Hills district in Worcestershire, England. The church is dedicated to Saint Peter.

Bredon School is located to the north of the village.

History

William Dowdeswell (1721–1775), the Worcestershire MP from 1761 until his death, was brought up at Pull Court in Bushley. Racing driver Richard Seaman (1913-1926), also lived at Pull Court.

References 

Villages in Worcestershire
Civil parishes in Worcestershire